In the Moment is the second studio album by American DJ and producer Kaskade. It was released on May 18, 2004 by OM Records.

Track listing

 The Australia-only release includes a bonus CD with mixes of 3 tracks from the It's You, It's Me album.

Personnel
 Ryan Raddon (Kaskade) – Production (all tracks), Writing (all tracks), Programming (1-5, 7, 9-12), Keyboards (3 & 5), Percussion (9)
 Finn Bjarnson – Production (all tracks), Writing (all tracks), Programming (1, 2, 4, 6, 7, 12, 13), Keyboards (2, 4-6, 10, 13), Guitar (1, 6, 7, 13), Acoustic Guitar (5), Percussion (3)
 Andy Caldwell - Featured Production/Programming/Keyboards in "Everything"
 Bret Garner - Vocals in "Steppin' Out"
 Anthony Green - Vocals in "Soundtrack to the Soul" (Slow Motion Mix) and "Move"
 Colette Marino (Colette) - Vocals in "I Like the Way"
 Amy Michelle - Vocals in "Honesty" and "Strum"
 Joslyn Petty (Joslyn) - Vocals in "Sweet Love" and "Everything"
 Amanda Wannamaker - Vocals in "Let You Go"
 Rob Wannamaker - Vocals in "One You" and "Let You Go", Additional Arrangement (13)
 Becky Jean Williams - Vocals in "Maybe"
 Yoni Gileadi – Programming & Additional Production/Arrangement (4 & 6)
 John Hancock – Additional Production/Arrangement & String Arrangement (2 & 9), Programming (2), Keyboards (2 & 9)
 Scott Johnson – Addition Production/Arrangement (7), Engineer (5), Guitar (7), Keyboards (1, 7, 11)
 Craig Poole – Additional Production/Arrangement (2 & 4), Bass (2 & 4), Acoustic Guitar (2)
 Randy Herbert – Drums (1)
 Darron Bradford – Flute (4)
 Rich Dixon – Electric Guitar (6), Guitar (11)
 Nathan Botts – Trumpet (13)
 Aaron Ashton – Violin (2 & 9)
 Mike Roskelley – Mixing
 Barry Gibbons – Mastering
 Monika Gromek – Artwork
 Alexander Warnow – Photography

External links
 In The Moment at Discogs

References

2004 albums
Kaskade albums